Lebetanthus is a genus of flowering plants belonging to the family Ericaceae.

Its native range is Southern Chile to Southern Argentina.

Species
Species:
 Lebetanthus myrsinites (Lam.) Macloskie

References

Epacridoideae
Ericaceae genera